Pawel Olszewski (born 2 March 1962) is a German modern pentathlete. He competed at the 1992 Summer Olympics.

References

External links
 

1962 births
Living people
German male modern pentathletes
Olympic modern pentathletes of Germany
Modern pentathletes at the 1992 Summer Olympics
People from Krotoszyn
Polish emigrants to Germany